Vlaška planina (Serbian Cyrillic: Влашка планина) is a mountain in southeastern Serbia, near the town of Dimitrovgrad. With Greben, Vlaška planina forms the gorge of Jerma river.

References

Mountains of Serbia